Vincent Muselli (born Argentan 1879, died Paris 1956) was a French writer and poet. He published numerous works of poetry, and won the Grand prix de littérature de la SGDL. He was a friend of Apollinaire.

References

French male poets
20th-century French poets
1879 births
1956 deaths
People from Argentan